Wuxi Grand Theatre is one of the key cultural projects in Wuxi, China. Wuxi Grand Theater stands on the south bank of Taihu Lake and covers a total area of more than 70,000 square meters. The building is designed by Finnish architect Pekka Salminen.

On the architecture 

The main idea of Wuxi Grand Theatre is based on its location.  The manmade peninsula on the northern shore area of Taihu Lake and the highway bridge nearby make this location comparable to that of Sydney Opera House.  Due to this location the building is an impressive landmark, rising up to a total height of 50 meters like a big sculpture from the terraced base. Its eight gigantic roof wings stretch far over the facades, giving the building a character of a butterfly, while protecting the building from the heat of the sun.

The architectural concept is unique: inside the steel wings are thousands of LED lights, which make it possible to change the colour of the wings according to the character of the performances.  This is possible, because the underside of the wings is covered by perforated aluminium panels. Another special feature is the “forest” of 50 light columns, each 9 meter high, which start from the main entrance square, support the roof of the central lobby and continue outside of the lakeside entrance into the lake.

A strong Chinese feature that runs throughout the whole building is the large scale use of bamboo, both a traditional and a modern Chinese material.  Recently new methods for the production and use of bamboo have made it possible to cover the Main Theatre Auditorium with over fifteen thousand solid bamboo blocks, all individually shaped according to acoustic needs and architectural image.  The Main Auditorium counts 1680 seats split up in main stalls and two balconies.  The horseshoe shape and compact volume combined with variable acoustics creates a flexible venue which can host traditional western style operas, Chinese operas, theatre performances, classical concerts, and even conferences.  The main auditorium is combined with a smaller 700-seat auditorium which is designed as a multifunctional black box theatre with retractable seats and multiple options for seating layout.

References

External links
Information and pictures on PES Architects website

Culture in Wuxi
Buildings and structures in Wuxi